WYMG (100.5 MHz) is a commercial FM radio station licensed to Chatham, Illinois, and serving the Springfield metropolitan area.  The station is owned by Saga Communications of Illinois, LLC, and it airs a classic rock radio format.

WYMG has an effective radiated power (ERP) of 50,000 watts, the current maximum for most FM stations in Illinois.  The transmitter is off County Road 15 West in Loami, Illinois.

History
In , the station first signed on the air. Its call sign was WEAI and its original city of license was Jacksonville, Illinois. It was the FM counterpart to WLDS 1180 AM and largely simulcast that station in its early years.  For most of the 1970s and 80s, it had a separate  automated format, playing Adult Top 40 hits.

The station has been assigned the call letters WYMG by the Federal Communications Commission since May 1, 1985.

References

External links
WYMG official website

YMG
Classic rock radio stations in the United States
Radio stations established in 1948